Villa Puerto Edén is a Chilean hamlet and minor port located in Wellington Island, in Natales commune, Última Esperanza Province, Magallanes Region. It is considered one of Chile's most isolated inhabited places together with Easter Island and Villa Las Estrellas. The village is known for being the home of the last Kawéshkar people. Owing to the large tidewater glaciers caused by the region’s super-high precipitation, it is only accessible by sea, on the Navimag ferry from Puerto Montt in the north, or Puerto Natales in the south. There is also a monthly boat from Caleta Tortel.

The population is 176 (2002 census). Owing to the extraordinarily humid climate the village has no roads, with only pedestrian boardwalks connecting the houses and shops. A weekly transport boat takes local fish and shellfish products (the latter mainly mussels) to markets. Margarita Vargas López, a member of the Chilean Constitutional Convention, was born and raised in Villa Puerto Edén.

Climate
Villa Puerto Edén has an extremely wet subpolar oceanic climate (Köppen Cfc) and is widely reputed to be the place in the world with the highest frequency of rainfall, though according to Guinness World Records the highest frequency of rain in a year occurred at Bahia Felix, a little further south, with only eighteen rainless days in the whole of 1916.

Gallery

See also
Wettest places on Earth
Puerto Edén Igneous and Metamorphic Complex

References 

Hamlets in Chile
Geography of Magallanes Region
Ports and harbours of Chile
Populated places established in 1937
Populated places in Última Esperanza Province
Populated places in the fjords and channels of Chile